Qareh Bolagh Sheykh Morad (also Romanized as Qareh Bolāgh Sheykh Morād; also known as Mo‘āfī, Mū‘āfī, Qareh Bolāgh, and Qareh Bolāgh-e Māfī) is a village in Howmeh-ye Sarpol Rural District, in the Central District of Sarpol-e Zahab County, Kermanshah Province, Iran. At the 2006 census, its population was 214, in 42 families.

References 

Populated places in Sarpol-e Zahab County